The Silver Star is the third-highest military decoration that can be awarded by the United States. It is awarded for gallantry in action against an enemy of the United States and may be awarded to any person who, while serving in any capacity with the armed forces, distinguishes himself or herself by extraordinary heroism.

The Silver Star is the successor decoration to the Citation Star which was established by an Act of the United States Congress on 9 July 1918. On 19 July 1932, the United States Secretary of War approved the Silver Star to replace the Citation Star.

Recipients

Citations

Silver Star
 
Foreign recipients of United States military awards and decorations